Catocala brandti is a moth of the family Erebidae first described by Hermann Heinrich Hacker and Peter Kautt in 1999. It is found in Greece, south-eastern Turkey, Iran and Israel.

Subspecies
Catocala brandti brandti (Turkey, Iran and Israel)
Catocala brandti schaideri Habeler & Hacker, 1999 (Greece)

References

brandti
Moths described in 1999
Moths of Europe
Moths of Asia